Rick May (September 21, 1940 – April 8, 2020) was a Canadian-American voice actor, theatrical performer, director, and teacher. May provided the English-language voice for Peppy Hare and Andross in Star Fox 64, the Soldier in Team Fortress 2, and Dr. M in Sly 3: Honor Among Thieves, among other video game characters. He also played Inspector Lestrade in the long running radio show The Further Adventures of Sherlock Holmes from 1998 through 2020.

Early life
May was born on September 21, 1940. He was raised in Washington and Canada. May attended Roosevelt High School in Seattle and St. Olaf College (class of 1962) in Northfield, Minnesota.

Career
May served in the U.S. military and was stationed in Japan, where he coordinated USO shows in Tokyo. May returned to the Seattle area to serve as the director of the Renton Civic Theatre and Civic Light Opera in Renton, Washington. In one production of the Cotton Patch Gospel in Renton, May played all 21 roles with a variety of voices. He retired from the Renton Civic Theatre in 2001 to begin his own theater company in Kirkland, Washington, and become a full-time actor.

He began voice acting in video games in the late 1990s, including roles as Peppy Hare and Andross in Star Fox 64; various campaign characters, including Genghis Khan, in Age of Empires II; and the Soldier in Team Fortress 2.

From 1998 through 2020, May played Inspector Lestrade in the Imagination Theatre radio series The Further Adventures of Sherlock Holmes. He also played Lestrade in the related radio series The Classic Adventures of Sherlock Holmes, and played various roles in other Imagination Theatre radio dramas. The last two episodes of The Further Adventures of Sherlock Holmes to feature May were recorded in late 2019, and were first broadcast in May 2020. May played the role of Inspector Lestrade longer than any other actor in the history of broadcasting.

Death and tributes
May suffered a stroke in February 2020, and was moved to a nursing home for rehabilitation. On April 8, 2020, it was reported that May had died from complications related to COVID-19 at Swedish Medical Center in Seattle.

On May 1, 2020, Valve released an update to Team Fortress 2 adding a tribute to May's voice work as the Soldier in the form of a new main menu theme titled "Saluting The Fallen" (a rendition of "Taps"), and locking the character image in the main menu to Soldier. The update also added statues of the Soldier saluting to most of the official in-game maps. These statues all featured a commemorative plaque dedicated to May, and remained in maps until June 1. The statues reappeared in the same locations on April 12, 2021, and 2022. The statues emit a number of pre-selected voice lines from the Soldier when approached. On August 21, 2020, a permanent tribute memorial was placed, in the form of a Soldier statue, and heads on the fence in front of the statue of the Soldier, in the map "Granary", which is the setting of the Team Fortress 2 video "Meet the Soldier".

Acting credits

Theater 
May performed in numerous roles throughout his theatrical career, including:

Brutus (in Julius Caesar)
Benjamin Franklin (in 1776)
Tevye (in Fiddler on the Roof)
Willy Loman (in Death of a Salesman)
Alfred Doolittle (in Pygmalion)
Theodore Roosevelt (in Bully!)
King Henry II (in The Lion in Winter)
Inspector Lestrade (on radio in The Further Adventures of Sherlock Holmes)

Voice-over 
His voice-overs include:

Filmography

References

External links

Rick May's website (Archived)

1940 births
2020 deaths
American theatre directors
Male actors from Seattle
Military personnel from Seattle
People from Kirkland, Washington
American male stage actors
American male video game actors
American male voice actors
American male radio actors
Canadian male stage actors
Canadian male video game actors
Canadian male voice actors
Canadian male radio actors
Deaths from the COVID-19 pandemic in Washington (state)
United States Army soldiers
Impact of the COVID-19 pandemic on the video game industry
St. Olaf College alumni